Aveline de Clare, Countess of Essex (c. 1178 – 1225) was an English noble.

She was a daughter of Roger de Clare, 2nd Earl of Hertford, and his wife, Matilda de St. Hilaire. Aveline married twice. Her first husband, William de Munchensy, died in 1204. She was remarried by 29 May 1205, to Geoffrey fitz Peter, Earl of Essex, as his second wife. She was widowed a second time on 14 October 1213.

King John granted the royal right over her remarriage to her step-brother, William, Earl of Arundel, along with the guardianship of her children by William de Montchesney/Munchanesy, on 7 May 1204. Soon after her second marriage she paid the crown for the wardship of John de Wahulle and custody of his land.

In her second widowhood, Countess Aveline made gifts to Holy Trinity, London, for the soul of Geoffrey fitz Peter, part of whose body was buried there. She was buried in Shouldham Priory, founded by Geoffrey fitz Peter in 1198, alongside the rest of her husband's body.

Children
By her first husband, William de Munchensy:
William died without heirs before 1213
Warin (b. 1192, d. July 1255); inherited Dec. 1213
Alice, married (1) John de Wahulle, (2) William de Breauté

By her second husband, Geoffrey Fitz Peter:
 John (b. 1205 • Shere, Surrey, England d. 23 November 1258) Married Isabel Bigod 
Hawise
Cecily

References

English countesses
13th-century English nobility
1170s births

1225 deaths
Year of birth uncertain
Date of death unknown
Place of birth missing
Daughters of British earls
12th-century English nobility
13th-century English women
12th-century English women